Lacibacter cauensis is a Gram-negative and aerobic bacterium from the genus of Lacibacter which has been isolated from sediments from the Taihu Lake in China.

References

External links
Type strain of Lacibacter cauensis at BacDive -  the Bacterial Diversity Metadatabase

Chitinophagia
Bacteria described in 2009